CI Games S.A. (formerly City Interactive S.A.) is a Polish video game developer and publisher based in Warsaw. Founded in 2002, originally as a budget-range game company, CI Games is best known for the Sniper: Ghost Warrior and Lords of the Fallen series.

History 
City Interactive was founded in 2002 through the merger of three video game companies: Lemon Interactive, We Open Eyes and Tatanka. The company originally acted as a developer and publisher of budget-range games. In 2007, City Interactive merged with Oni Games, a third-party publisher formed alongside City Interactive in 2002, and Detalion, an adventure game developer founded by Roland Pantoła, Maciej Miąsik, Danuta Sienkowska, Robert Ożóg, Łukasz Pisarek and Krzysztof Bar, when they left LK Avalon. Also in 2007, City Interactive undertook its initial public offering and became a public company listed on the Warsaw Stock Exchange.

In 2008, City Interactive dropped their budget-range operations, which they wished to underline with the subsequent release of Sniper: Ghost Warrior in 2010. In an interview with magazine MCV, the company stated that the success of the game led them to believe that they had made the right decisions in terms of strategy and product portfolio. By June 2011, City Interactive employed a total of 150 people in its headquarters in Warsaw, its development studios in Rzeszów, Katowice, Poznań and Guildford, and its publishing offices in Germany, the United Kingdom, Canada and the United States. In 2012, City Interactive's development team adopted the name "CI Games", and City Interactive changed its name entirely to CI Games in 2013.

In February 2018, CI Games shrunk their development staff to 30 people. According to chief executive officer Marek Tymiński, the measure had been taken due to many problems having occurred during the production of Sniper Ghost Warrior 3, even though the game itself had surpassed one million copies sold and had turned a profit for the company in the company's 2017 fiscal year by the time the decision was made. In January 2019, CI Games established a new publishing label, United Label, for independent games. United Label is to help fund indie developers in exchange for a share of the games' revenue. From 2020 through to 2021, the number of CI Games employees increased significantly, with the current team now over 140 people and growing. Around eighty members of staff are directly involved in game production, with forty of those working on Sniper Ghost Warrior Contracts 2, fifty on Lords of the Fallen 2, and the remainder forming the QA department.

Games

Games developed 
 Alien Rage (formerly Alien Fear)
 Armed Forces Corp.
 Art of Murder: FBI Confidential
 Art of Murder 2: Hunt for the Puppeteer
 Art of Murder: The Secret Files
 Art of Murder 3: Cards of Destiny
 Art of Murder: Deadly Secrets
 Battlestrike: Force of Resistance (released as Mortyr III in Eastern Europe)
 Battlestrike: Road to Berlin (also known as WWII: Battlestrike)
 Battlestrike: Shadow of Stalingrad (also known as Battlestrike: Force of Resistance 2)
 Battlestrike: The Siege
 Beauty Factory
 Brain College: 3 Days ZOO Mystery
 Brain College: Aquatica: The sunken city
 Brain College: Ancient Quest of Saqqarah
 Brain College: Aztec Adventures
 Brain College: Blood Ties
 Brain College: Call of Atlantis
 Brain College: Chinese Temple
 Brain College: Coyote's Tales: Sisters of Fire and Water
 Brain College: El Dorado Quest
 Brain College: Herod's Lost Tomb
 Brain College: Lost City of Z
 Brain College: Magic Bootique
 Brain College: Pharaoh's Mystery
 Brain College: Stoneloops of Jurassica
 Brain College: The Mystery of the Mary Celeste
 Brain College: Tropical Lost Island
 Chicken Riot
 Chronicles of Mystery: Curse of the Ancient Temple
 Chronicles of Mystery: Secret of the Lost Kingdom
 Chronicles of Mystery: The Legend of the Sacred Treasure
 Chronicles of Mystery: The Scorpio Ritual
 Chronicles of Mystery: The Secret Tree of Life
 Code of Honor: The French Foreign Legion
 Code of Honor 2: Conspiracy Island
 Code of Honor 3: Desperate Measures
 Combat Wings
 Combat Wings: Battle of Britain
 Combat Wings: Battle of the Pacific
 Combat Wings: Great Battles of WWII (also known as Dogfight 1942)
 Combat Zone: Special Forces
 Cooking Academy
 Cooking Academy 2
 Crime Lab: Body of Evidence
 Enemy Front
 Farm Frenzy
 I Love Beauty: Hollywood Makeover
 I Love Beauty: Make Up Studio
 Jade Rousseau: The Fall of Sant Antonio
 Jet Storm: Modern Dogfights (also known as Jetfighter 2015)
 Jewels of Atlantis
 Jewels of Sahara
 Jewels of the Ages
 Jewels of Tropical Lost Island
 Logic Machines
 Lords of the Fallen
 Murder in Venice
 Operation Thunderstorm (also known as Mortyr IV: Operation Thunderstorm)
 Party Designer
 Project Freedom (also known as Space Interceptor and Starmageddon 2)
 Redneck Kentucky and the Next Generation Chickens
 SAS: Secure Tomorrow
 Shutter Island
 Smash Up Derby
 Sniper: Art of Victory
 Sniper: Ghost Warrior
 Sniper: Ghost Warrior 2
 Sniper Ghost Warrior 3
 Sniper Ghost Warrior Contracts
 Sniper Ghost Warrior Contracts 2
 Sushi Academy
 Tank Combat
 The Chickenator
 The Hell in Vietnam
 The Royal Marines Commando
 Terrorist Takedown
 Terrorist Takedown: Covert Operations
 Terrorist Takedown: Payback
 Terrorist Takedown: War in Colombia
 Terrorist Takedown 2
 Terrorist Takedown 3
 Vampire Moon: The Mystery of the Hidden Sun
 Wings of Honour
 Wings of Honour: Battles of the Red Baron
 Wolfschanze II
 WWII: Pacific Heroes

Games published 
 Aggression: Reign Over Europe
 Airborne Troops (developed by Widescreen Games)
 Alarm for Cobra 11: Crash Time II (developed by Synetic)
 Alcatraz (developed by Silden)
 Apassionata
 Dark Sector (PC port; developed by Digital Extremes)
 Dusk 12: Deadly Zone (developed by Orion Games)
 Farm Frenzy (Nintendo DS Port; developed by Alawar Entertainment)
 Heat Wave (developed by Nemesys Games)
 Hidden Target (developed by Gingerbread Studios, also known as Jonathan Kane: The Protector and The Mark 2)
 MotorM4X: Offroad Extreme (developed by The Easy Company)
 Pirate Hunter (developed by ND games and D10 Soft)
 Pyroblazer (developed by Candella Studios and Eipix)
 RTL Biathlon 2009
 RTL Winter Sports 2009
 SCAR (Squadra Corse Alfa Romeo)
 Specnaz 2 (developed by BYTE Software)
 Street Racer: Europe
 The History Channel: Great Battles of Rome
 TrackMania Turbo: Build to Race (Nintendo DS port)
 Ubersoldier II (developed by Burut Creative Team, also known as Crimes of War)
 Wolfschanze 1944 (developed by Calaris)

References

External links 
 

Companies based in Warsaw
Polish companies established in 2002
Video game companies established in 2002
Video game companies of Poland
Video game development companies
Video game publishers